Phomopsis arnoldiae is a fungal plant pathogen infecting walnuts.

References

External links
 USDA ARS Fungal Database

Fungal tree pathogens and diseases
Nut tree diseases
arnoldiae